Pacto de sangre (lit. Blood Pact) is a Chilean telenovela produced by AGTV Producciones and Grupo Secuoya and broadcast by Canal 13 from September 24, 2018 to May 28, 2019.

Cast

Main 
 Pablo Macaya as Gabriel Opazo
 Álvaro Espinoza as Benjamín Vial
 Pablo Cerda as Raimundo Costa
 Néstor Cantillana as Marco Toselli
 Ignacia Baeza as Trinidad Errázuriz
 Loreto Aravena as Josefa Urrutia
 Blanca Lewin as Maite Altamirano
 Josefina Montané as Ágata Fernández

Supporting 
 Tamara Acosta as Carmen Núñez
 Álvaro Gómez as Feliciano Fernández
 Cristián Campos as Hernán Errázuriz
 Hernán Contreras as Alonso Errázuriz
 Patricia Guzmán as Elvia Díaz
 Silvia Novak as Teresa Correa
 Willy Semler as Manuel Tapia
 Javiera Hernández as Isabel Bustos
 Antonia Bosman as Daniela Solis Núñez / "Vanessa"
 Rodrigo Walker as Ignacio Vial Errázuriz
 Antonia Giesen as Karina Leiva
 Antonia Aldea as Dominga Costa Altamirano
 Julieta Sanhueza as Clara Vial Errázuriz
 Andrés Arriola as Rozas
 Felipe Ríos as Roberto

Special participation 
 Catalina Vera as Melany
 Daniel Antivilo as Sanhueza

References

External links 
  

2018 Chilean television series debuts
2019 Chilean television series endings
2018 telenovelas
Chilean telenovelas
Canal 13 (Chilean TV channel) telenovelas
Spanish-language telenovelas
Television shows set in Santiago